Alexander Sergeyevich Yakushev (born January 2, 1947) is a former ice hockey player and coach for the Soviet Union.

Born in Moscow, Soviet Union, Alexander Yakushev is best known to North American hockey fans as one of the stars for the Soviet team that played Team Canada in the famous 1972 Summit Series. His style of play was atypical of his colleagues who were fast and skilled; he was often described as the equivalent of Canada's Phil Esposito. Although often overshadowed by his famous teammate Valeri Kharlamov, by the end of the Summit Series, Yakushev led the Soviets in scoring with 7 goals and 4 assists for 11 points. Besides the Summit Series, he has also played in numerous Olympic and World Championship tournaments, winning Olympic gold in 1972 and 1976 and having been crowned World Champion seven times.

After retiring from hockey, Yakushev coached Spartak Moscow for several years and between 1998 and 2000 the Russian national team. On June 26, 2018, it was announced that he would be inducted into the Hockey Hall of Fame November 12, 2018, joining fellow Summit Series teammates Vladislav Tretiak and Valeri Kharlamov.

References

External links

 Alexander Yakushev at Hockey CCCP International

1947 births
HC Spartak Moscow players
Hockey Hall of Fame inductees
Ice hockey players at the 1972 Winter Olympics
Ice hockey players at the 1976 Winter Olympics
IIHF Hall of Fame inductees
Living people
Medalists at the 1972 Winter Olympics
Medalists at the 1976 Winter Olympics
Olympic gold medalists for the Soviet Union
Olympic ice hockey players of the Soviet Union
Olympic medalists in ice hockey
Russia men's national ice hockey team coaches
Soviet expatriate ice hockey players
Soviet expatriate sportspeople in Austria
Soviet ice hockey left wingers
Soviet ice hockey coaches
Spartak athletes
Ice hockey people from Moscow